David Ackerly (born 27 November 1960) is a former Australian rules footballer who played with South Melbourne and North Melbourne in the VFL during the 1980s.

Ackerly played in the back pocket and was South Melbourne's best and fairest in 1980 and 1982.

In 1991 and 1992, he played 36 games and kicked 3 goals for Williamstown in the Victorian Football Association including the losing 1992 grand final against Sandringham at Carlton. He finished in third place in the Club best and fairest in 1991, won the most consistent player award and also the Ron James MVP. Ackerley was assistant coach in 1992.

He is currently employed as an assistant coach of football at Wesley College, Melbourne.

References

External links

1960 births
Living people
Bob Skilton Medal winners
Sydney Swans players
North Melbourne Football Club players
Williamstown Football Club players
Australian players of Australian rules football
Victorian State of Origin players
Australia international rules football team players